Soraya Miré (born 1961) is a Somali writer, filmmaker and activist against female genital mutilation.

life
Soraya Miré was born at Beledweyne. Aged thirteen, she endured female genital infibulation. Miré's' documentary film Fire Eyes (1994) began with Miré recalling her own experience of FGM, and included interviews with a range of others involved with the practice.

Works

Films
 Fire Eyes: Female Circumcision, 1994

Books
 (with Eve Ensley) The Girl with Three Legs: A Memoir, 2011

References

External links
 Personal website 

1961 births
Living people
Somalian women's rights activists
Activists against female genital mutilation
Documentary film directors
Somalian women film directors
Somalian film directors
Somalian health activists
Violence against women in Somalia
Women documentary filmmakers